Elizabeth A. Johnson was a prominent advocate of Kansas history. She discovered, purchased, and donated the land that makes up the Pawnee Indian Museum State Historic Site to the state of Kansas in 1899. At the time, it was considered to be the first place the United States flag was raised on the state of Kansas.

In the 1870s, Johnson became interested in Zebulon Pike and the possibility that the events surrounding the raising of the U.S. flag occurred nearby. She discovered what was believed to be the site in 1875 and, after studying Pike's journals and investigating another reported Pawnee site in southern Nebraska, concluded that this was the village that Pike had visited. To protect the site from being plowed, she and her husband bought the land. In 1901, the Johnsons donated the site to the state of Kansas for historic preservation.

Johnson's claim was supported by Elliott Coues, who had edited Pike's journal; with his endorsement, it was accepted by the Kansas State Historical Society. In 1901, Johnson donated the land to the state of Kansas, which built a  granite monument commemorating Pike's symbolic triumph over Spain. At the dedication of the monument, several of the speakers drew parallels between the Pike episode and the recent American victory in the Spanish–American War. In 1906, a four-day festival was held to celebrate the centennial of the flag incident.

Subsequent research showed that Pike's expedition had not visited this village, but the Kitkehahki village now known as the Pike-Pawnee Village Site, located on the Republican River in Webster County in south-central Nebraska. The error was a fortunate one, however: it led to the preservation of the site in Kansas, whereas the Nebraska site had been degraded by years of cultivation.

References

People from Republic County, Kansas